Ted Burke (18 July 1877 – 29 January 1967) was an Australian rules footballer who played with Collingwood in the Victorian Football League (VFL).

Notes

External links 
		
Ted Burke's profile at Collingwood Forever

1877 births
1967 deaths
Australian rules footballers from Melbourne
Collingwood Football Club players